The 2006 United States Senate election in Indiana was held November 7, 2006. Incumbent Republican United States Senator Richard Lugar was re-elected to his sixth six-year term with 87.3% of the vote. He did not have a Democratic opponent and only faced opposition from a Libertarian candidate; this was the only U.S. Senate race in 2006 in which Democrats did not field a candidate. This would be the last successful race of Lugar's decades long political career. This is also the last time that Lake, Marion, and Monroe counties have voted for a Republican candidate for Senate. Also, this was last election until 2022 in which an Indiana incumbent senator won re-election (Dan Coats was re-elected in 2010 as a non-incumbent former senator).

Candidates

Libertarian 
 Steve Osborn, radio operator

Republican 
 Richard Lugar, incumbent U.S. Senator

Campaign 
Lugar faced no opposition from the Democratic Party, as they felt that he was unbeatable. The Indiana Senate race was the only one in 2006 in which the incumbent did not face a challenger from the other major party. Also running was Libertarian Steve Osborn. Osborn was from La Porte, Indiana and was an amateur radio operator. Exit polls projected a landslide victory for Lugar which was borne out by the result.

Predictions

Results

Overall 
The election was not close as Lugar faced only a Libertarian candidate, as no Democrat filed to run. Osborn's best performance was in Starke County where he received just 23.7% of the vote. This is one of the best statewide showings for a third party candidate in Indiana.

By county 
Lugar won all 92 of Indiana's counties by varying margins.

See also 
 2006 United States Senate elections
 2006 United States House of Representatives elections in Indiana

References 

2006
Indiana
2006 Indiana elections